The Violin Concerto No. 3 in E major was composed by Niccolò Paganini in 1826. On 12 December 1826, Paganini wrote from Naples to his friend L. G. Germi that, having recently completed his Second Violin Concerto, he had now "finished orchestrating a third with a Polacca", and added: "I would like to try these concertos out on my own countrymen before producing them in Vienna, London and Paris." In the event, the Third Violin Concerto does not seem to have been premiered until July 1828 in Vienna. After Paganini's death in 1840, it was not performed again for more than a century, until it was rediscovered in the late 1960s and first recorded and publicly performed by Henryk Szeryng in 1971.

Structure 
The concerto is in three movements:

External links 
 

3
1826 compositions
Compositions in E major